The 1198 papal election (held 8 January) was convoked after the death of Pope Celestine III; it ended with the election of Cardinal Lotario dei Conti di Segni, who took the name Innocent III. In this election for the first time the new pope was elected per scrutinium.

Death of Celestine III

Pope Celestine III had been elected to the papacy in 1191 at the age of 85. In spite of his very advanced age, his pontificate lasted almost seven years.

A little before Christmas 1197, the 91-year-old Pope began to feel ill, and summoned all the cardinals to a meeting in his presence, announcing that they should discuss the matter of electing his successor. He stated that he was willing to abdicate the papacy on condition that his close collaborator, Cardinal Giovanni di San Paolo, would be elected the new pope. Cardinal Giovanni, the cardinal-priest of S. Prisca, had been conducting all of the pope's business for him, except the consecration of bishops. The cardinals unanimously rejected the pope's suggestion, saying that they would not elect him with that condition, and that it was unheard of for a pope to depose himself. In fact, Cardinal Octavianus, the Bishop of Ostia, was working to become pope, as were Cardinal Petrus of Porto, Cardinal Giordano of S. Pudenziana, and Cardinal Graziano of Ss. Cosma e Damiano.

Two weeks later, on 8 January 1198, Celestine III died, and on the same day the cardinals started proceedings for the election of his successor.

List of participants

At the death of Celestine III there were 29 cardinals in the Sacred College. However, no more than 21 were present at Rome:

Four electors were created by Celestine III, five by Lucius III, one by Alexander III and the remaining thirteen by Clement III.

Absentees

At least eight cardinals were absent:

Election of Pope Innocent III

On the same day that Celestine III died, some of the cardinals assembled at the Sapta Solis monasterii Cliviscauri, which is taken by scholars to be the Septizodium, or possibly in the nearby church of Santa Lucia in Septisolio. Others accompanied the body of the dead pope to its funeral in the Lateran Basilica. Following the return of the cardinals from the funeral, they assembled in voluntary enclosure, as reported by pope Innocent himself on a letter on January 9. This may have been done to guarantee safety and freedom in the election, given the presence and influence of the Germans in Italy.

Not for the first time (secundum morem), the electors voted by scrutiny (per scrutinium). Some cardinals were elected scrutineers; they counted the votes, recorded the result and announced it to the rest of the Sacred College. In the first scrutiny Cardinal Giovanni di Salerno received the greatest number of votes (ten), but declared that he would not accept the election to the pontificate. Ottaviano di Paoli also received three votes, but declared his own preference for Lotario. In the second scrutiny the cardinals united their votes in favor of 37-year-old Cardinal Lotario dei Conti di Segni, deacon of SS. Sergio e Bacco, who was the youngest of all the cardinals. He accepted his election and took the name Innocent III. The name was possibly chosen for him by cardinal Graziano da Pisa, as a means to supplant the memory of Antipope Innocent III.

On 22 February 1198 the new pope was ordained to the priesthood and consecrated to the episcopate by Cardinal Ottaviano di Paoli, bishop of Ostia e Velletri, and solemnly crowned by Cardinal Graziano da Pisa of SS. Cosma e Damiano, the protodeacon.

Notes

Sources

 

 
 

Piazzoni, Ambrogio M. (2003). Storia delle elezioni pontificie Atti, documenti segreti, cronache del tempo e curiosità svelano i retroscena delle quasi trecento elezioni papali dalle origini della Chiesa ai giorni nostri  Asti: Piemme. .
 
 Julien Théry-Astruc, "Introduction", in  Innocent III et le Midi (Cahiers de Fanjeaux, 50), Toulouse, Privat, 2015, p.11-35.

12th-century elections
1198
1198
12th-century Catholicism
1198 in Europe